Bringfried Lothar Müller (28 January 1931 – 10 April 2016) was a German footballer and manager who played as a defender.

Born in Gera, he began his career in 1951 with hometown club BSG Wismut Gera and moved to BSG Wismut Karl-Marx-Stadt (now FC Erzgebirge Aue) in 1954, remaining there until his retirement in 1965. He won the FDGB-Pokal in 1955 and the DDR-Oberliga in 1956, 1957 and 1959.

He managed his now relocated former team BSG Wismut Aue in two spells (1965–67, 1971–77), with a spell at FC Karl-Marx-Stadt (now Chemnitzer FC) inbetween (1968–70).

He earned 18 caps for East Germany, making his debut in a 3–2 away friendly win against Romania on 18 September 1955 and bowing out with a win by the same score against Morocco in Casablanca on 11 December 1960. He took part in qualifiers for the 1958 FIFA World Cup and UEFA Euro 1960.

He was married to the renowned figure skating trainer Jutta Müller (née Lötzsch).

References

1931 births
2016 deaths
Sportspeople from Gera
German footballers
Association football defenders
East German footballers
East Germany international footballers
German football managers
East German football managers
FC Erzgebirge Aue players
DDR-Oberliga players
Chemnitzer FC managers
FC Erzgebirge Aue managers
Footballers from Thuringia
German footballers needing infoboxes
People from Bezirk Gera